Alfred-Müller-Felsenburg-Preis is a prize awarded in recognition of critical literature writings, created by Hans-Werner Gey in 1988.

History

Description

Winners

External links

References

Footnotes

Citations

German non-fiction literary awards
1988 establishments in Germany
Awards established in 1988